Peter Norman Furness (born 2 Sept 1955) is a British pathologist, professor of pathology at the University of Leicester, and president of the Royal College of Pathologists 2008–2011.

References 

1955 births
Living people
Academics of the University of Leicester
British pathologists
Presidents of the Royal College of Physicians